Ishtiryakovo (İştiräk) is a rural locality (a village) in Verkhneyanaktayevsky Selsoviet, Baltachevsky District, Bashkortostan, Russia. The population was 201 as of 2010. There are 4 streets.

Geography 
Ishtiryakovo is located 17 km south of Starobaltachevo (the district's administrative centre) by road. Chishma is the nearest rural locality.

References 

Rural localities in Baltachevsky District